Sonia Guiñansaca (born in Cuenca, Ecuador in 1989) is a migrant poet, cultural organizer and activist whose work aims for culture equality and social justice, focusing on migrant rights, climate change, LGBTQ+ rights, and gender discrimination.

Background
Guiñansaca migrated from Ecuador to Harlem at the age of five to reunite with her parents, who were undocumented. After graduation (Hunter College with a BA in Africana Puerto Rican Latino Studies and Women and Gender Studies) with her background in organizing migrant undocumented communities, she determined that not only policy but art and culture play crucial roles to bring social changes. Since 2013 she worked at Culture Strike as the managing director, an American organization with more than 200 artists of multiple disciplines working for a social change acknowledging and supporting queer, transgender, women, color, migrant emergent artists. In particular, she created the first writing workshops by and for undocumented writers, then co-created the first and only national writing retreat for undocumented writers called UndocuWriters Retreat. In Spring 2013 created and helped launch Undocumenting.tmblr.com, a project highlighting the work of undocumented immigrants. Guiñansaca has performed in many different places such as Museo del Barrio, Nuyorican Poets Café, NY Poetry Festival, The Met, Brooklyn Museum, London, Mexico, and featured in Latina Magazine, PBS, Poetry Foundation, etc. She also presented Keynotes, workshops and panels in different Universities. In October 2017 she self-published her debut chapbook Nostalgia & Borders and is editing the first undocumented poetry anthology Home in Time of Displacement and currently working on a new chapbook #PapiFemme, which will focus on the central themes of gender and presentation, as well as the queer and immigrant communities. She was named by Teen Vogue as one of the "13 Coolest Queers on the Internet."

Works
Nostalgia & Borders, 2017.

References

People from Cuenca, Ecuador
Hunter College alumni
Queer women
1989 births
Living people
Ecuadorian poets
Ecuadorian emigrants to the United States
21st-century Ecuadorian women writers
21st-century poets